The Köprülü family was a noble family of Albanian origin in the Ottoman Empire. The family hailed from the town of Rudnik (near Berat) in the Sanjak of Vlora and provided six Grand Viziers of the Ottoman Empire (including Kara Mustafa Pasha, who was adopted), with several others becoming high-ranking officers. The era during which these grand viziers served is known as the Köprülü era of the Ottoman Empire.

Another notable member of the family was Köprülü Abdullah Pasha (1684–1735), who was a general in Ottoman-Persian wars of his time and acted as the governor in several provinces of the empire. Modern descendants include Mehmet Fuat Köprülü, a prominent historian of Turkish literature. Members of the family continue to live in Turkey, the Maghreb, and the United States.

Köprülü grand viziers 
During the history of the Ottoman Empire, the Köprülü Grand Viziers had a reputation for dynamism in a state that would later show signs of decline and stagnation. The early viziers in particular focused on military campaigns that extended the Empire's power. This, however, came to an end after the disastrous Battle of Vienna launched by Kara Mustafa Pasha, a member of the family (see also the Treaty of Karlowitz).

1 Kara Mustafa Pasha had been adopted by the Köprülü family and was the brother-in-law of Köprülü Fazıl Ahmet Pasha.

2 Abaza Siyavuş Pasha was a servant of Köprülü Mehmet Pasha. By marrying his daughter, Siyavuş became a son-in-law (damat) of the powerful Köprülü family.

See also 
 Köprülü era of the Ottoman Empire
 Veles, a city in North Macedonia (named Köprülü under Ottoman rule)
 Vezirköprü, a Turkish town named after the family

References

External links 
 

 
Grand Viziers of the Ottoman Empire
Albanian Grand Viziers of the Ottoman Empire
17th-century Grand Viziers of the Ottoman Empire
18th-century Grand Viziers of the Ottoman Empire
Families from the Ottoman Empire
Political families
People from Berat
People from Vezirköprü